The Socialist Party (or PS), is a socialist party in Tunisia. Established in 2006 under its original name Left Socialist Party (or PSG), the party however wasn't legalized before 2011.

History
The party was established in 2006 as a split from banned Tunisian Workers' Communist Party. Under the rule of Zine El Abidine Ben Ali, the new party however remained illegal, too, until the Tunisian Revolution in 2011.

On 17 January 2011, the party was legalized together with two other opposition parties. It subsequently contested the 2011 Constituent Assembly election as part of the Democratic Modernist Pole alliance, which won 5 out of the 217 seats.

On 3 October 2012, the party adopted its new name, dropping "Left Socialist Party" in favor of simply "Socialist Party". It participated in the Union for Tunisia alliance to contest the 2014 legislative election, but eventually withdrew and filed its own lists, which however didn't manage to win a seat.

References

External links

2006 establishments in Tunisia
2006 in Tunisian politics
2011 in Tunisian politics
Formerly banned political parties in Tunisia
Formerly banned socialist parties
Marxist parties
Political parties established in 2006
Socialist parties in Tunisia